Enterprise Lithuania is a non-profit organization owned by the Ministry of Economy of the Republic of Lithuania. Its mission is the support for small and medium size enterprises and encouragement of Lithuanian producers’ export.

It was founded in November 2009 (former Lithuanian Development Agency). It consists of the Export and Small and Medium-Sized Business Departments and Point of Single Contact for Services and Products.

It maintains Lithuanian Exporters Database which is a free online platform tailored for companies that are looking for a reliable business partner in Lithuania. Coordinates Startup Lithuania community which is a one stop shop for startups in Lithuania, organizes trade missions.

Sources
 Lithuania - A Major Investment and Cooperation Opportunity. EU-Japan Centre for Industrial Cooperation. Accessed 2010-12-10.
 Seminar "USA – the dream country for Lithuanian business? Experience, advice, perspective". The American Chamber of Commerce in Lithuania. Accessed 2010-12-10.

External links
 
 www.verslilietuva.lt - official site in Lithuanian

Ministry of Economy (Lithuania)
Government agencies established in 2009
Non-profit organizations based in Lithuania